Brice Stratford is an English director, writer, historian, folklorist, actor-manager, and heritage campaigner. His work focuses on classical and Shakespearean theatre, the New Forest area of Southern England, British folklore, Anglo Saxon mythology, and the preservation of historic architecture and the built environment. He runs the Owle Schreame theatre company, which he founded, and writes about architectural and cultural heritage for The Critic, Apollo, The Spectator, and other periodicals. His first two books, New Forest Myths and Folklore and Anglo-Saxon Myths: the Struggle for the Seven Kingdoms, are due for publication in 2022.

Career
He has worked primarily in classical and Shakespearean theatre, particularly with the Owle Schreame theatre company, which he founded in 2008. He received an Off-West End award in 2013, and established the Owle Schreame Awards in 2014.

In 2017 his research demonstrated that Arthur Conan Doyle had been the architect of the 1912 redesign of Glasshayes House in Lyndhurst.<ref>Bird, Steve. "Conan Doyle Haunted Hotel Under Threat of Demolition", The Daily Telegraph, 20 March 2021</ref> In 2018 he led a campaign to save the Lord Amiens theatre of Aldborough House in Dublin, which has been described as "Ireland's oldest theatre", from demolition.Keane, Rebecca.  In 2021 he spoke out against English Heritage's custodianship of Hurst Castle, after a significant portion collapsed into the sea."Wall collapse in England's historic castle", TheCivilEngineer.org, 9 March 2021 His articles on architectural and cultural heritage for The Critic have been praised by Charles Saumarez Smith, and his first book, New Forest Myths and Folklore, was published by The History Press in 2022. His second, Anglo-Saxon Myths: The Struggle for the Seven Kingdoms, was published later in the same year by Batsford Books, and was described as "little short of revelatory" by Alexander Larman in the Observer, who also praised its "vibrant prose".

The Owle Schreame theatre company
Stratford founded the Owle Schreame theatre company in 2008 in Cambridge. In 2011 he produced, directed and performed in Measure for Measure on the site of the former Rose Theatre. Archived 28 December 2013. In 2013 the company's "Cannibal Valour" programme at St Giles-in-the-Fields in Camden consisted of The Unfortunate Mother by Thomas Nabbes (1640) and two other Renaissance plays, Honoria and Mammon by James Shirley (1659) and Bussy D'Ambois by George Chapman. Stratford played the title character in Bussy D'Ambois. In 2015 the company performed Ralph Roister Doister, written in 1553 by Nicholas Udall and thought to be the earliest surviving English comedy, at the Bread & Roses pub in Clapham; Stratford played the title role.

Books
 New Forest Myths and Folklore, London, The History Press, 2022, .
 Anglo-Saxon Myths: the Struggle for the Seven Kingdoms'', London, Batsford Books, 2022,

References

Living people
English theatre directors
Actor-managers
English male Shakespearean actors
English male stage actors
Artistic directors
Brice
Year of birth missing (living people)